Julie-Anne Monico (born 16 March 1976) is an Australian gymnast. She competed in six events at the 1992 Summer Olympics.

References

External links
 

1976 births
Living people
Australian female artistic gymnasts
Olympic gymnasts of Australia
Gymnasts at the 1992 Summer Olympics
Place of birth missing (living people)